Nicrophorus cadaverinus is not currently a valid species name, although the name has been applied independently to three different Nicrophorus species, each of which had already been described an alternate name:

Nicrophorus vespillo, mistakenly described as the new species N. cadaverinus in 1807 by Johann Ludwig Christian Gravenhorst
Nicrophorus vestigator, mistakenly described as the new subspecies N. sepultor cadaverinus in 1840 by Mareuse
Nicrophorus germanicus, mistakenly described as the new species N. cadaverinus in 1857 by Gistel